Seyed Reza Fatemi Amin born 1974 in Shiraz, Iran is the Minister of Industry, Mines and Trade In the thirteenth government of the Islamic Republic of Iran.

References

1974 births

Living people

Government ministers of Iran

People from Fars Province